Jo Durie and Jeremy Bates were the defending champions but lost in the quarterfinals to Robin White and Scott Davis.

Nicole Provis and Mark Woodforde won in the final 6–3, 4–6, 11–9 against Arantxa Sánchez Vicario and Todd Woodbridge.

Seeds
Champion seeds are indicated in bold text while text in italics indicates the round in which those seeds were eliminated.

Draw

Final

Top half

Bottom half

References
 1992 Australian Open – Doubles draws and results at the International Tennis Federation

Mixed Doubles
Australian Open (tennis) by year – Mixed doubles